Polish Students' Association is the oldest of Polish student societies. It was created in 1950 in Polish People's Republic. Currently it has about 10,000 members in about 100 academic institutions.

See also
Independent Students Union
Union of Polish Youth

References

1950 establishments in Poland
Student organizations established in 1950
Student societies in Poland